Purshottam Narayan Gadgil Jewellers is an Indian jewellery company. Established in 1832 by Ganesh Gadgil, the company operated in two branches, with P. N. Gadgil & Sons in Sangli, and P. N. Gadgil & Company in Pune, until the branches' legal separation in 2012. One of the oldest jewellery companies in India, the company is known for producing jewellery distinct to Maharashtra.

History 
The company was established as Gadgil Jewellers in Sangli on 29 November 1832, by Ganesh Gadgil. Lacking a store, the business was initially run on the pavement of a busy thoroughfare in the city. After the birth of Gadgil's sons, he renamed the company Gadgil Jewellers & Sons. Gadgil moved the business to a wada he purchased in Sangli in 1860. Under Gadgil's father, the family had previously served as savakars to the Kolhatkar and Modak families of the Princely state of Sangli, and were thus accorded the office of royal jeweller to the Patwardhan kings of the State after the establishment of their jewellery business.

Gadgil initially intended all three of his sons to succeed him in the business, but after his eldest son Ramchandra became a moneylender and dairy proprietor, and his youngest son Gopal became a lawyer and went on to set up a clothing store, the business was continued by his middle son Narayan and his descendants. After the birth of his eldest grandson Purshottam in 1874, Gadgil changed the name of the company to P. N. Gadgil Jewellers & Sons, believing that his grandson's name (Purshottam)  would bring the business good luck.

After Gadgil's death in 1890, the company was managed by his son Narayan Gadgil and Narayan's three sons. After Narayan Gadgil's death in 1920, the company was managed by Purshottam and his younger brothers Ganesh Gadgil II and Vasudev Gadgil. After Purshottam's death in 1954, the company's management was inherited by his younger brothers and their sons. In 1958, Anant "Dajikaka" Gadgil, a younger son of Ganesh Gadgil II, and Vishwanath Gadgil ( son of Vasudeo Gadgil) set up a branch of the company in Pune under the name P. N. Gadgil Jewellers & Company.

After 1958, the two branches of the company continued to function under the same brand. Dajikaka Gadgil, Vishwanath Gadgil and Laxman Gadgil  managed the business in Pune, where as Vasudev's  his son Hari and Shankar (Dajikaka's elder brother) managed the company in Sangli.  After Vasudev Gadgil's death in 1965, the Sangli branch of the company was inherited by his son Hari and Ganesh's son Shankar, son of  Ganesh and their sons Yashawant, until their own deaths in 2005 and 1980, respectively. Now Sangli branch is managed by Hari's sons Dhananjay and Ganesh and his grandson Siddharth along with Shakar's sons Prakash and grandsons Milind, Raju and Sameer. The two branches were formally separated in 2012, with the Pune branch operating as P. N. Gadgil & Company and the Sangli branch continuing to operate as P. N. Gadgil & Sons. Dajikaka Gadgil died in 2014, and few stores of Pune branch of the company was inherited by his son and grandson.

Operations
Since 2015, the Pune branch of the company has expanded operations using a franchising model across various cities in Maharashtra, and in the United States, and the United Arab Emirates, In 2012, PNG Sons established itself with two showrooms located at Chinchwad and Nashik, and by 2020 had expanded to over 29 showrooms. As of 2022, the One of the Pune branch (25 stores)is managed by Ajit Gadgil under name PNG and sons. Sangli branch has 10 stores in Maharashtra, Kokan and Karnatak are managed under name M/S Purushottam Narayan Gadgil.

In November 2017, PNG Sons became a public limited company with four independent directors on its eight-members board of directors.

In 2021, the company was added to the Fortune India 500 list.

In January 2021, the firm was duped by potential franchise partners for 1.6 crore.

Promotions
The Pune branch has also become associated with several Bollywood celebrities, being endorsed by Salman Khan and Madhuri Dixit. They have also provided jewellery to several Bollywood productions, most notably Bajrangi Bhaijan and Bajirao Mastani. The company has provided jewelry to Marathi movies like Balgandharva and Katyar Kaljat Ghusali, among others.

References

External links 

Interview with President Ajit Gadgil and CEO Amit Modak in 2022 (in Marathi)

Indian brands
Companies established in 1832
Companies based in Pune
Companies based in Maharashtra
Retail companies established in 1832
Jewellery retailers of India